Le Héros was a French Navy  of the M6 series commissioned in 1934. She participated in World War II on the side of the Allies until June 1940, and then in the naval forces of Vichy France until she was sunk in 1942.

Characteristics 

Le Héros was part of a fairly homogeneous series of 31 deep-sea patrol submarines also called "1,500-tonners" because of their displacement. All entered service between 1931 and 1939.

They displaced  on the surface and  underwater. When submerged, their two electric motors produced a combined  and allowed them to reach .

Construction and commissioning 

Le Héros was authorized under the 1929 naval program and was laid down along with her sister ship  at Arsenal de Brest in Brest, France, on 1 August 1929 with the hull number Q170. Le Héros was launched on 14 October 1932. She completed fitting out for her sea trials on 15 October 1933, successfully finished her trials on 8 January 1934, and completed fitting out on 10 June 1934. Declared complete on 25 June 1934, she was commissioned on 12 September 1934.

Service history

World War II

French Navy 
When World War II began in September 1939, Le Héros was assigned to the 1st Submarine Division based at Toulon, France.

From 8 to 29 March 1940, she carried out a patrol in the South Atlantic Ocean between Fernando de Noronha and the coast of Brazil, without success. In April 1940, the rest of the 1st Submarine Division was transferred to Bizerte in Tunisia, but Le Héros and Le Glorieux were based at Dakar in Senegal.

German ground forces advanced into France on 10 May 1940, beginning the Battle of France, and Italy declared war on France on 10 June 1940 and joined the invasion. The Battle of France ended in France's defeat and armistice with Germany and Italy, which went into effect on 25 June 1940. Le Héros was still assigned to the 1st Submarine Division that day, home-ported at Toulon but apparently stationed at Dakar.

Vichy France 

After France's surrender, Le Héros served in the naval forces of Vichy France. apparently stationed initially at Dakar. After the attack on Mers-el-Kébir — in which a British Royal Navy squadron attacked a French Navy squadron moored at the naval base at Mers El Kébir in Oran on the coast of Algeria on 3 July 1940 — Le Héros and Le Glorieux got underway from Dakar at 04:30 on 4 July 1940 in company with a Latécoère 302 flying boat to retaliate by attacking the British heavy cruiser , which was patrolling south of Dakar. They received orders at 16:00 to return to Dakar. During their return voyage, a seaplane from Dorsetshre attacked them, narrowly missing Le Glorieux with two bombs.

On 7 July 1940, a British naval force arrived off Dakar and, as a part of Operation Catapult, transmitted an ultimatum at 18:00. The French did not reply, and ordered Le Héros and Le Glorieux to put to sea. Many members of their crews initially refused to fight the British, but the commanding officer of Le Héros convinced them to participate in the sortie. The two submarines got underway to conduct the attack, but sources differ on the details of what followed. According to one account, they left Dakar together and anchored southeast of the island of Gorée at 21:30 on 7 July, then set off to attack the British squadron on 8 July 1940, a French sloop-of-war mistakenly opening fire on them as they departed, and submerged off Dakar at 11:20. In another version of the events, Le Héros was still moored in Dakar on 8 July and got underway at dawn that day, while Le Glorieux departed a few hours later; mistaken for a British submarine attempting to infiltrate the harbor, Le Glorieux suffered some light damage when she came under heavy gunfire from three French ships and was bombed by a French seaplane. In either event, both submarines spent the day submerged off Dakar and attempted to attack the British ships there but could not get close enough, and the British departed the area and headed for Freetown after Fleet Air Arm Fairey Swordfish torpedo bombers from the aircraft carrier  attacked and seriously damaged the French battleship  at Dakar that day. Both submarines returned to Dakar during the night of 8–9 July 1940.

By 8 August 1940, Le Héros and Le Glorieux were at Casablanca in French Morocco, From 5 to 7 November 1940, Le Héros and her sister ship  operated south of Cabo de Gata, Spain, to reconnoiter Gibraltar.

Le Héros and Le Glorieux later proceeded to Toulon, where they were placed under guard and maintained in a disarmed and unfueled status under the terms of the 1940 armistice. On 1 June 1941 they began training for a deployment to Dakar and from there to Madagascar in the Indian Ocean. They departed Toulon on 28 September 1941 and, after stops at Oran from 1 to 3 October and Casablanca from 5 to 7 October, arrived on 12 October 1941 at Dakar, where they both entered drydock from 15 to 19 October 1941 for hull cleaning.

In October 1941, the British boarded and captured a convoy of four Vichy French cargo ships en route to Dakar. To retaliate, the French ordered Le Glorieux and Le Héros to attack British trade routes along the coast of South Africa. The two submarines got underway from Dakar in company with a convoy on 27 October 1941 to continue their journey to Madagascar. Thode Fagelund sank at 04:42, but her entire crew survived. Le Héros attempted an attack on another merchant ship during the evening of 17 November, but without success.

After arriving at Djibouti, Le Héros conducted a patrol in the Gulf of Tadjoura off French Somaliland from 27 February to 2 March 1942. She got underway from Djibouti on 17 March 1942 to return to Madagascar and arrived at Diego-Suarez on 27 March 1942.

On 2 May 1942, Le Héros departed Diego-Suarez to escort another cargo ship carrying supplies to Djibouti. Fearing a Japanese attack on Madagascar, which would compromise India's security and supplies, the British invaded Madagascar, beginning with amphibious landings in Courrier Bay near Diego-Suarez at dawn on 5 May 1942. Throughout the afternoon of 5 May, she received more and more alarming reports from Madagascar about British progress in the invasion. She was still  from Diego-Suarez when a British aircraft forced her to dive at 15:00 on 6 May 1942.

Loss 

At 03:10 on 7 May 1942, Le Héros passed around the northern tip of Madgascar, heading for Courrier Bay on the northwestern coast to attack the British invasion fleet there. After skirting a French minefield, she reached a position off Courrier Bay at 04:30. At dawn, a flight of eight Fairey Swordfish torpedo bombers from the aircraft carrier  surprised her on the surface either north or west of Courrier Bay, according to different sources, and attacked her with depth charges. She crash-dived, but a violent explosion shook her, knocking out her electrical power, rupturing her compressed air and diesel fuel systems, damaging her forward diving planes, and creating a leak which allowed seawater to enter her forward battery room, causing the release of poisonous chlorine gas. The exploding depth charges forced her to the surface, and her commanding officer ordered her crew to abandon ship.

Le Héros′s entire crew of 72 men was left drifting in rough seas, and those without lifebelts quickly became exhausted and sank to their deaths. Sometime later, sharks began to attack the survivors. British ships reached the scene four hours after Le Héros sank, and the infantry landing ship  rescued 52 survivors. One source claims that other survivors reached the coast of Madagascar on their own. Sources disagree on the number of men lost, claiming 19, 20, and 24 men missing.

Notes

References

Footnotes

Bibliography 

 
 
 
 

Redoutable-class submarines (1928)
1932 ships
Ships built in France
World War II submarines of France
Maritime incidents in May 1942
Lost submarines of France
Submarines sunk by aircraft
Ships sunk by British aircraft
World War II shipwrecks in the Indian Ocean